Ewig mir dir ("Forever with You") is the fourteenth studio album by German singer Thomas Anders. It was released by the Warner Music Group on 19 October 2018. Produced by Christian Geller, it peaked at number 12 on the German Albums Chart.

Track listing
All tracks produced by Christian Geller.

Charts

Release history

References

2018 albums
Thomas Anders albums
Warner Music Group albums